Paul Müller (22 February 1896 – 1974) was a Swiss ice hockey player who competed in the 1924 Winter Olympics.

In 1924, he participated with the Swiss ice hockey team in the first Winter Olympics tournament.

Müller died in 1974.

References

External links
list of Swiss ice hockey players

1896 births
1974 deaths
Ice hockey players at the 1924 Winter Olympics
Olympic ice hockey players of Switzerland